The Bronfman Fellowship is a non-profit educational program for young Jews in Israel and North America.

It was founded in 1987 by philanthropist Edgar M. Bronfman, and is partially funded through his foundation, The Samuel Bronfman Foundation. It was formerly known as The Bronfman Youth Fellowships in Israel (BYFI).

The Bronfman Fellowship selects 26 outstanding North American teenagers and 20 Israeli teenagers for a rigorous academic year of seminars including a free, five-week trip to Israel for North American Fellows ("Bronfmanim") between the summer of Fellows’ junior and senior years of high school, and a free trip to the United States for Israeli Fellows ("Amitim") during their final year of high school. The program educates and inspires exceptional young Jews from diverse backgrounds to grow into leaders grounded in their Jewish identity and committed to pluralism.

The Bronfman Fellowship's network of over 1,400 alumni include 8 Rhodes Scholars, 2 Schwarzman Scholars, 4 Supreme Court clerks, 18 Fulbright Scholars, 35 Wexner Fellows and 27 Dorot Fellows.

Their 2011 applicant to Fellow ratio was 12:1, whereas Yale’s was 14:1 and Harvard’s 16:1. The Bronfman Fellowship has been listed by Chuck Hughes, former Senior Admissions Officer at Harvard, in his book, "What it Really Takes to Get Into the Ivy League and other Highly Selective Colleges" as one of the programs which "act as filters for admissions officers to validate candidates who have been similarly identified by other organizations for talent and promise."

History 
The Bronfman Fellowship was founded in 1987 by Edgar M. Bronfman, in response to what he perceived as a lack of dialogue among the various Jewish denominations in North America. Edgar also dreamed of a "renaissance of Torah study," in which all Jews would not only be welcomed into the dialogue but would also be equipped with the thoughtfulness and Jewish literacy to engage in serious study of Jewish texts. In 1998, the organization launched Amitei Bronfman, its program for young Israelis. Today, the Bronfman Fellowship is one of the most well-respected youth programs in the Jewish nonprofit space.

Educational philosophy 
The Bronfman Fellowship's "Bronfmanim Impact Framework" outlines four core developmental goals for Fellows: Community Builders, Deep Thinkers, Moral Voices, and Cultural Creators. Their methodology for achieving these goals is grounded both in experiential learning and in Jewish text study, facilitated by professional rabbis and Jewish educators who share the Fellowship's philosophical commitments. The Fellowship places particular emphasis on the intellectual autonomy of the young Fellows, rather than on any one particular worldview or mode of Jewish practice.

The Fellowship utilizes Jewish text study as a central pedagogical framework. A broad variety of works serve as jumping-off points for conversation, including canonical texts such as the Tanakh and the Talmud, philosophy, literature, poetry, and visual art.

The Bronfman Fellowship's pedagogy is also relational, with knowledge emerging not from one rabbi or text but from ongoing conversations among Fellows and faculty. One of the first traditional texts which each Fellowship cohort studies is a famous line of Pirkei Avot which translates to “make for yourself a teacher, acquire for yourself a friend.” This text is used to introduce one of the core tenets of the program: that connecting with others and engaging in challenging dialogue with them allows friends to become teachers, and teachers to become friends. The Fellowship intentionally selects as religiously and politically diverse a cohort as possible.

Program description 
The Bronfman Fellowship program consists of three dedicated group experiences, regular video conferences throughout the year, and a culminating project.

The first of these experiences is the Immersive Summer Experience, which takes place in Israel (with the exception of the 2020 cohort, whose program was fully remote, and the 2021 cohort, whose program is being held in the United States). Fellows spend five weeks in Israel, engaging in learning and bonding with their peers while traveling the country. They also have the opportunity to live in a homestay with an Israeli Fellow ("Amit") during part of the trip.

In December, the Israeli Amitim come to the United States for their own travel experience, as well as a weekend retreat and a homestay with the American Fellows.

In the Spring, Fellows embark on a five-day exploration of American-Jewish identity in a Northeastern city, typically New York City or Washington, D.C.

Throughout the Fellowship Year, Fellows work on their Beyond Bronfman project, a process of exploration of a question or idea, which culminates in an artifact which Fellows then share with their peers.

Alumni  
Following the Fellowship Year, Bronfman Fellows join an alumni community of over 1,400 people across North America and Israel. Alumni are able to take advantage of programs such as collegiate gatherings, lectures and seminars, mentoring programs, interest groups, and a pluralism discussion series. The Bronfman Fellowship’s approach to building a community among alumni at different life stages has been featured by The Schusterman Family Foundation’s Alumni Playbook.

In 2005, The Bronfman Fellowship launched the Bronfman Alumni Venture Fund (AVF), the first Jewish mini-grant program of its kind, which fundraises from the Fellowship’s North American and Israeli alumni for the sole purpose of re-distributing that funding to alumni-led projects. Projects supported serve the wider community and perpetuate the values of pluralism, Jewish learning, engagement with Israel, and social responsibility. As of early 2020, the AVF has distributed over $300,000 in grants as well as valuable peer support to impactful projects led by over 160 alumni. The AVF was named one of the nation’s 50 most innovative Jewish nonprofits by Slingshot in their 2010-11 and 2011-12 guides.

Notable alumni

Authors 

 Jonathan Safran Foer
 Dara Horn
 Daniel Handler, pen name Lemony Snicket
Ilana Kurshan
Itamar Moses

Journalists 

 Matti Friedman
 Adam Davidson, NPR business correspondent and NYT Magazine Columnist
 Jonathan Tepperman, Managing Editor of Foreign Affairs
 Anya Kamenetz, lead education blogger at NPR and author of The Art of Screen Time

Filmmakers 

 Amir Bar Lev, documentary film director
Etan Cohen
Noah Oppenheim

Creatives 

 Alex Riff, poet and co-founder of the Cultural Brigade for Russian-Jewish Israeli Heritage 
Aryeh Nussbaum Cohen, counter-tenor

Jewish leaders 

 Angela Warnick Buchdahl, senior rabbi at Manhattan's Central Synagogue
 Joshua Foer and Brett Lockspeiser, co-creators of Sefaria  
 Judith Rosenbaum, Executive Director of the Jewish Women’s Archive
 Yehuda Kurtzer, President of the Shalom Hartman Institute of North America

Other
Tali Farhadian, former federal prosecutor and a candidate in the New York County District Attorney race in 2021

See also
 Edgar Bronfman Sr.

External links
 Bronfman Fellowships 25th Anniversary Magazine

References

Fellowships
Jewish organizations based in the United States